David Drahoninsky is a Czech paralympic archer. He won the gold medal at the Men's individual compound - W1 event at the 2008 Summer Paralympics in Beijing.

References

Czech male archers
Living people
Paralympic gold medalists for the Czech Republic
Paralympic bronze medalists for the Czech Republic
Paralympic archers of the Czech Republic
Archers at the 2008 Summer Paralympics
Year of birth missing (living people)
Medalists at the 2008 Summer Paralympics
Paralympic medalists in archery